The Dunedin and Suburbs North by-election 1863 was a by-election held on 3 September 1863 in the  electorate during the 3rd New Zealand Parliament.

The by-election was caused by the resignation of incumbent MP Thomas Dick.

The election was won by Julius Vogel. As no other candidate was proposed, he was duly declared elected unopposed.

References

Dunedin and Suburbs North 1863
1863 elections in New Zealand